The 2001–02 Sporting de Gijón season was the fourth consecutive season of the club in Segunda División after its last relegation from La Liga.

Overview
After finishing the previous season, Pepe Acebal continued at the helm of the club. Real Sporting finished the season in the sixth position and was eliminated in the round of 16 by Villarreal of the Copa del Rey after beating previously Oviedo, in the first Asturian derby played in four years, and La Liga team Deportivo Alavés.

Squad

From the youth squad

Competitions

La Liga

Results by round

League table

Matches

Copa del Rey

Matches

Squad statistics

Appearances and goals

|}

References

External links
Profile at BDFutbol
Official website

Sporting de Gijón seasons
Sporting de Gijon